The Leeds municipal elections were held on Thursday, 11 May 1950, with one third of the seats to be elected.

The election was sparsely contested owing to an electoral truce between Labour and the Conservatives in anticipation of the impending boundary changes to take effect the following year. However the Liberals and Communists fielded candidates in a number of wards - although the Liberals' two candidates was much reduced from recent showings, whilst conversely the Communists contesting of over a quarter of wards was well above their usual three. Eight wards in total were opposed, with the five Labour and three Conservative incumbents easily defending them, ensuring an uneventful result in contrast to the national picture.

Election result

The result had the following consequences for the total number of seats on the council after the elections:

Ward results

References

1950 English local elections
1950
1950s in Leeds